The kolion is a local currency created to support the farmers of Kolionovo, a small town located 125 km south-east of Moscow.  The currency gained notoriety after the creator of the currency, Mikhail Shlyapnikov, was arrested and the kolion was declared illegal tender in Russia.

History
The kolion was created by Mikhail Shlyapnikov in 2014. The kolion is pegged so that 1 kolion is equivalent to 10 kg of potatoes and 2 kolions are pegged at 10 eggs. Because the farmers of Kolionovo received rubles only twice a year, the kolion was created as an alternative currency accepted only in Kolionovo.

In June 2015, Shlyapnikov was arrested and the kolion was declared illegal.

References

8. Russian Farmer Alters Rural Economy With Virtual Currency, as Moscow Watches Warily. by Thomas Grove. The Wall Street Journal, April 22, 2018

External links

A farm outside of Moscow gets a new chance at life in the crypto zone - RBTH

Local currencies
Currencies of Russia